The following outline is provided as an overview of and topical guide to industrial machinery:

Essence of industrial machinery 
 Heavy equipment
 Hardware
 Industrial process
 Machine
 Machine tool
 Tool

Industrial machines 
 Agricultural equipment
 Assembly line
 Industrial robot
 Oil refinery
 Packaging and labeling
 Paper mill
 Sawmill
 Smelter
 Water wheel

Industrial processes 
 Bessemer process
 Food processing
 Manufacturing
 Mining
 Packaging and labeling

History of industrial machinery 
 History of agricultural machinery
 History of assembly lines
 History of the bessemer process
 History of heavy equipment
 History of industrial robots
 History of machines
 History of machine tools
 History of oil refineries
 History of packaging and labeling
 History of paper mills
 History of smelting
 History of water wheels

See also 
 Outline of industry

External links 

Industrial machinery
Industrial machinery
 
Industry-related lists